The corset has been an indispensable supportive undergarment for women, in Europe for several centuries, evolving as fashion trends have changed and being known, depending on era and geography, as a pair of bodies, stays and corsets. The appearance of the garment represented a change from people wearing clothes to fit their bodies to changing the shape of their bodies to support and fit their fashionable clothing.

A "pair of bodies" or stays, the supportive garments that predated corsets, first became popular in sixteenth-century Europe, with corsets reaching the zenith of its popularity in the Victorian era. While the corset has typically been worn as an undergarment, it has occasionally been used as an outer-garment; stays as outer-garments can be seen in the national dress of many European countries.

Etymology
The English word corset is derived from the Old French word corps and the diminutive of body, which itself derives from corpus—Latin for body. The term "corset” was in use in the late 14th century, from the French "corset" which meant "a kind of laced bodice." The meaning of it as a "stiff supporting so constricting undergarment for the waist, worn chiefly by women to shape the figure," dates from 1795. The term "stays" was frequently used in English circa 1600 until the early twentieth century, and was used interchangeably with corset in the Renaissance.

Before the 16th century

The earliest known representation of a possible corset appears on a figurine from Minoan art made circa 1600 BCE. The article of clothing depicted might be perceived as a corset, but is worn as an outer garment, and leaves the breasts exposed.

Corsets have been used for centuries among certain tribes of the Caucasus: Circassians and Abkhaz. They were used to "beautify" women and also to ensure modesty. Corsets were laced tightly with as many as fifty laces, and had to be worn from childhood until the wedding night. When the marriage was consummated, a groom had to slowly and carefully undo each lace to demonstrate self-control.

16th and 17th centuries

For most of the sixteenth and seventeenth centuries corsets were known, in English, as bodies or stays. These garments could be worn as under or outer wear. The women of the French court saw this corset as "indispensable to the beauty of the female figure."

Early pairs of bodies were typically made out of layered fabrics like linen and silk, stiffened with starch, and were not tightly laced as it was impossible to do so in this era without damaging your expensive and ridiculously time-consuming to make, bust support garment. While a few surviving bodies/stay exist that are structured with steel or iron, these are generally considered to have been either orthopedic or novelty constructions and were not worn as part of mainstream fashion, although some dress historians believe that they were not worn at all. 

By the end of the sixteenth century, bodies were commonly worn garment among the elites of Europe. The garments gradually began to incorporate the use of a "busk," a long, flat piece of whalebone or wood sewn into a casing on the corset in order to maintain its stiff shape. The front of the corset was typically covered by a "stomacher," a stiff, V-shaped structure that was worn on the abdomen for decorative purposes.

In the Elizabethan era, whalebone (baleen) was frequently used in corsets so bodices could maintain their stiff appearance. A busk, typically made of wood, ivory, metal, or whalebone, was added to stiffen the front of the bodice. It was then carved and shaped into a thin knife shape and inserted into the Elizabethan bodice, then fastened and held into place by laces, so that the busk could be easily removed and replaced.

18th and early 19th centuries
The most common type of corset in the 1700s was an inverted conical shape, often worn to create a contrast between a rigid quasi-cylindrical torso above the waist and heavy full skirts below. The primary purpose of 18th-century stays was to raise and shape the breasts, tighten the midriff, support the back, improve posture to help a woman stand straight, with the shoulders down and back, and only slightly narrow the waist, creating a "V" shaped upper torso over which the outer garment would be worn; however, "jumps" of quilted linen were also worn instead of stays for informal situations. Deriving from the French word jupe, which in the eighteenth century referred to a short jacket, jumps were only partially boned and padded with cotton to provide support for the breasts while not being restrictive. Jumps were made of silk, cotton, or linen and often embroidered. Jumps fastened over the breasts with ties such as silk ribbons, buttons, and sometimes, metal hooks. Both garments were considered undergarments, and would be seen only under very limited circumstances. Well-fitting eighteenth-century corsets were quite comfortable, did not restrict breathing, and allowed women to work, although they did restrict bending at the waist, forcing one to protect one's back by lifting with the legs.

Transition to the Victorian
By the 1830s, steel stays had begun to replace the classic whalebone. The diarist Emily Eden recorded that she had to obtain a silver "husk" before accompanying her brother to India because a humid climate rusted the usual steel and spoilt the garment. In 1839, a Frenchman by the name of Jean Werly made a patent for women's corsets made on the loom. This type of corset was popular until 1890: when machine-made corsets gained popularity. As seen in various fashion advertisements of the era, the common corset cost one dollar ($1). Before this, all corsets were handmade - and, typically, home-made.

The Victorian corset

Late 19th century
For dress reformists and men of the late 1800s, corsets were a dangerous moral ‘evil’, promoting promiscuous views of female bodies and superficial dalliance into fashion whims. They exaggerated health risk, claiming that they could remove ribs or rearrange internal organs and compromised fertility; weakness and general depletion of health were also blamed on excessive corsetry. With fashion being the only way many women could express themselves, men did what they could to discourage it. Eventually, the reformers' and male critique of the corset joined a throng of voices clamoring against tightlacing. Though it wasn't common, the horror stories of the women who did often tightlace angered enough people as the 19th century progressed. Preachers inveighed against tightlacing, doctors counseled patients against it.

American women active in the anti-slavery and temperance movements, with experience in public speaking and political agitation, demanded sensible clothing that would not restrict their movement. While support for fashionable dress contested that corsets maintained an upright, ‘good figure’, as a necessary physical structure for moral and well-ordered society, these dress reformists contested that women’s fashions were not only physically detrimental but “the results of male conspiracy to make women subservient by cultivating them in slave psychology.” They believed a change in fashions could change the whole position of women, allowing for greater social mobility, independence from men and marriage, the ability to work for wages, as well as physical movement and comfort.

In 1873 Elizabeth Stuart Phelps Ward wrote:

The Edwardian corset

Post-Edwardian long line corset

From 1908 to 1914, the fashionable narrow-hipped and narrow-skirted silhouette necessitated the lengthening of the corset at its lower edge. A new type of corset covered the thighs and changed the position of the hip, making the waist appear higher and wider. The new fashion was considered uncomfortable, cumbersome, and required the use of strips of elastic fabric.  The development of rubberized elastic materials in 1911 helped the girdle replace the corset.

After World War I
Shortly after the United States' entry into World War I in 1917, the U.S. War Industries Board asked women to stop buying corsets to free up metal for war production. This step liberated some 28,000 tons of metal, enough to build two battleships.

However, these garments were better known as girdle with the express purpose of reducing the hips in size. A return to waist nipping corsets in 1939 caused a stir in fashion circles but World War II ended their return. In 1952, a corset known as 'The Merry Widow' was released by Warner's. Initially, the Merry Widow was a trademark of the famous Maidenform company, which designed it for Lana Turner's role in a 1952 movie of the same name. The Merry Widow differed from earlier corsets in that it separated the breasts, whereas corsets had held them together. Both the Merry Widow and girdles remained popular throughout the 1950s and 1960s. However, in 1968 at the feminist Miss America protest, protestors symbolically threw a number of feminine products into a "Freedom Trash Can." These included girdles and corsets, which were among items the protestors called "instruments of female torture".

See also

References

Further reading

 Sorge-English, Lynn, Stays and Body Image in London: The Staymaking Trade, 1680–1810 (Pickering & Chatto, 2014)
 Steele, Valerie, The Corset: A Cultural History (Yale University Press, 2001)
 Vincent, Susan, The Anatomy of Fashion: Dressing the Body from the Renaissance to Today (Berg, 2009)

Corsets
Corsets
Corsets
Corsets
Corsets
corsetry
Corsets